Niedergailbach is a small village in the German state of Saarland and belongs to the community of Gersheim in the Saarpfalz-Kreis. In 2000 it had 581 inhabitants. Located on the border with France, it is adjacent to the French village of Obergailbach.

External links
 https://web.archive.org/web/20060619223646/http://www.niedergailbach.com/index2.htm

Towns in Saarland
Palatinate (region)